Gjirokastër is a city in the Republic of Albania and the seat of Gjirokastër County and Gjirokastër Municipality. It is located in a valley between the Gjerë mountains and the Drino, at 300 metres above sea level. Its old town is a UNESCO World Heritage Site, described as "a rare example of a well-preserved Ottoman town, built by farmers of large estate". The city is overlooked by Gjirokastër Fortress, where the Gjirokastër National Folklore Festival is held every five years. It is the birthplace of former Albanian communist leader Enver Hoxha, and author Ismail Kadare.

The city appears in the historical record dating back in 1336 by its Greek name, as part of the Byzantine Empire. It became part of the Orthodox Christian diocese of Dryinoupolis and Argyrokastro after the destruction of nearby Adrianoupolis. Gjirokastër later was contested between the Despotate of Epirus and the Albanian clan of John Zenevisi before falling under Ottoman rule for the next five centuries (1417–1913). Throughout Ottoman occupation, Gjirokastër was officially known in Ottoman Turkish as Ergiri and also Ergiri Kasrı. During the Ottoman period conversions to Islam and an influx of Muslim converts from the surrounding countryside made Gjirokastër go from being an overwhelmingly Christian city in the 16th century into one with a large Muslim population by the early 19th century. Gjirokastër also became a major religious centre for Bektashi Sufism. Taken by the Hellenic Army during the Balkan Wars of 1912–13 on account of its large Greek population, it was eventually incorporated into the newly independent state of Albania in 1913. This proved highly unpopular with the local Greek population, who rebelled; after several months of guerrilla warfare, the short-lived Autonomous Republic of Northern Epirus was established in 1914 with Gjirokastër as its capital. It was definitively awarded to Albania in 1921. In more recent years, the city witnessed anti-government protests that led to the Albanian civil war of 1997.

Along with Muslim and Orthodox Albanians, the city is also home to a substantial Greek minority along with a considerable Aromanian community. Together with Sarandë, the city is considered one of the centers of the Greek minority in Albania, and there is a consulate of Greece.

Names and etymology 

The city appeared for the first time in historical records under its medieval name of Argyrókastron, as mentioned by John VI Kantakouzenos in 1336. The name comes from argyrón, and kástron, derived from Latin , meaning "castle" or "fortress"; thus "silver castle". Byzantine chronicles also used the similar name Argyropolýchni. The theory that the city took the name of the Princess Argjiro, a legendary figure about whom 19th-century author Kostas Krystallis wrote a short novel and Ismail Kadare wrote a poem in the 1960s, is considered folk etymology, since the princess is said to have lived later, in the 15th century.

The definite Albanian form of the name of city is Gjirokastra, while in the Gheg Albanian dialect it is known as Gjinokastër, both of which derive from the Greek name. Alternative spellings found in Western sources include Girokaster and Girokastra. During the Ottoman era, the town was known in Turkish as Ergiri.

History

Early history  

During the Middle Helladic period (2100-1550 BC), a double tumulus was dug out in Vodhinë, with strong similarities to the grave circles at Mycenae, showing a common ancestral link with the Myceneans of southern Greece. The Phrygian period of the region spanned from around 1150 BCE to around 850 BCE. Hammond argues that the region was checkered with a mosaic of small Phrygian principalities, with the principality of Gjirokastër and the surrounding region having its center at Vodhinë. In the later part of the period, it appears there was a change of dynasty at Vodhine.

Archaeological evidence demonstrates that during the Bronze Age, the region was inhabited by populations who likely spoke a northwestern Greek dialect. Archaeologists have found pottery artifacts dating to the early Iron Age, crafted in a style that first appeared in the late Bronze Age in Pazhok, Elbasan County, and is found throughout Albania. The earliest recorded inhabitants of the area around Gjirokastër were the Greek-speaking tribe of the Chaonians, which belonged to the Epirote group. In antiquity the local urban centre was located in Antigonia, c.  from modern Gjirokastër on the opposite bank of river Drino.

Medieval period 

The city's walls date from the third century. The high stone walls of the Citadel were built from the sixth to the twelfth century. During this period, Gjirokastër developed into a major commercial center known as Argyropolis (meaning "Silver City") or Argyrokastron (meaning "Silver Castle").

The city was part of the Despotate of Epirus and was first mentioned by the name Argyrokastro by John VI Kantakouzenos in 1336. That year Argyrokastro was among the cities that remained loyal to the Byzantine Emperor during a local Epirote rebellion in favour to Nikephoros Orsini-Doukas. The first mention of Albanian nomadic groups occurred in the early 14th century, where they were searching for new pasture lands and ravaging settlements in the region. These Albanians had entered the region and took advantage of the situation after the Black death had decimated the local Epirote population. During 1386–1417 it was contested between the Despotate of Epirus and the Albanian clan of John Zenevisi. In 1399 the Greek inhabitants of the city joined the Despot of Epirus, Esau, in his campaign against various Albanian and Aromanian tribesmen. In 1417 it became part of the Ottoman Empire and in 1419 it became the county town of the Sanjak of Albania. During the Albanian Revolt of 1432–36 it was besieged by forces under Thopia Zenevisi, but the rebels were defeated by Ottoman troops led by Turahan Bey. In 1570s local nobles Manthos Papagiannis and Panos Kestolikos, discussed as Greek representative of enslaved Greece and Albania with the head of the Holy League, John of Austria and various other European rulers, the possibility of an anti-Ottoman armed struggle, but this initiative was fruitless.

According to Turkish traveller Evliya Çelebi, who visited the city in 1670, at that time there were 200 houses within the castle, 200 in the Christian eastern neighborhood of Kyçyk Varosh (meaning small neighborhood outside the castle), 150 houses in the Byjyk Varosh (meaning big neighborhood outside the castle), and six additional neighborhoods: Palorto, Vutosh, Dunavat, Manalat, Haxhi Bey, and Memi Bey, extending on eight hills around the castle. According to the traveller, the city had at that time around 2000 houses, eight mosques, three churches, 280 shops, five fountains, and five inns. From the 16th century until the early 19th century Gjirokastër went from being a predominantly Christian city to one with a Muslim majority due to much of the urban population converting to Islam alongside an influx of Muslim converts from the surrounding countryside.

Modern 

In 1811, Gjirokastër became part of the Pashalik of Yanina, then led by the Albanian-born Ali Pasha of Ioannina and was transformed into a semi-autonomous fiefdom in the southwestern Balkans until his death in 1822. In 1833 Albanian rebels took over the town causing the Ottoman government to comply with rebel terms. After the fall of the pashalik in 1868, the city was the capital of the sanjak of Ergiri. On 23 July 1880, southern Albanian committees of the League of Prizren held a congress in the city, in which was decided that if Albanian-populated areas of the Ottoman Empire were ceded to neighbouring countries, they would revolt. During the Albanian National Awakening (1831–1912), the city was a major centre of the movement, and some groups in the city were reported to carry portraits of Skanderbeg, the national hero of the Albanians during this period. Gjirokastër from the middle of the nineteenth century also prominently contributed to the wider Ottoman Empire through individuals that served as Kadıs (civil servants) and was an important centre of Islamic culture.
In early March 1908, the binbashi of Gjirokastër was assassinated by Çerçiz Topulli and his followers.
The pro-Albanianists of the city during 1909–1912 were split between two groups: the urban liberals who wanted to cooperate with the Greeks and Albanian nationalists who formed guerilla bands operating in the countryside. During the 19th and early 20th century, Albanian speaking Muslims were the majority population of Gjirokastër, while only a few Greek-speaking families lived there.

Given its large Greek population, the city was claimed and taken by Greece during the First Balkan War of 1912–1913, following the retreat of the Ottomans from the region. However, it was awarded to Albania under the terms of the Treaty of London of 1913 and the Protocol of Florence of 17 December 1913.

This turn of events proved highly unpopular with the local Greek population, and their representatives under Georgios Christakis-Zografos formed the Panepirotic Assembly in Gjirokastër in protest. The Assembly, short of incorporation with Greece, demanded either local autonomy or an international occupation by forces of the Great Powers for the districts of Gjirokastër, Sarandë, and Korçë.

In April 1939, Gjirokastër was occupied by Italy following the Italian invasion of Albania. On December 8, 1940, during the Greco-Italian War, the Hellenic Army entered the city and stayed for a five-month period before capitulating to Nazi Germany in April 1941 and returning the city to Italian command. After the capitulation of Italy in the Armistice of Cassibile in September 1943, the city was taken by German forces and eventually returned to Albanian control in 1944.

The postwar communist regime developed the city as an industrial and commercial centre. It was elevated to the status of a museum town, as it was the birthplace of the leader of the People's Socialist Republic of Albania, Enver Hoxha, who had been born there in 1908. His house was converted into a museum.

The demolition of the monumental statue of the authoritarian leader Enver Hoxha in Gjirokastër by members of the local Greek community in August 1991 marked the end of the one-party state It was the last statue in Albania to be demolished during the Fall of Communism in Albania, which happened in 28 July 1991, 5 months after the rest of the statues that were demolished since February and marked the end of the one-party state. 

Gjirokastër suffered severe economic problems following the end of communist rule in 1991. In the spring of 1993, the region of Gjirokastër became a center of open conflict between Greek minority members and the Albanian police. The city was particularly affected by the 1997 collapse of a massive pyramid scheme which destabilised the entire Albanian economy. The city became the focus of a rebellion against the government of Sali Berisha; violent anti-government protests took place which eventually forced Berisha's resignation. On 16 December 1997, Hoxha's house was damaged by unknown attackers, but subsequently restored.

Geography 

The present municipality was formed at the 2015 local government reform by the merger of the former municipalities of Antigonë, Cepo, Gjirokastër, Lazarat, Lunxhëri, Odrie and Picar, that became municipal units. The seat of the municipality is the town Gjirokastër. The population of the former municipality at the 2011 census was 19,836.

Climate 

Gjirokastër is situated between the lowlands of western Albania and the highlands of the interior, and has thus a hot-summer Mediterranean climate, though, (as is normal for Albania), much heavier rainfall than usual for this climate type.

Economy 

Gjirokastër is principally a commercial center with some industries, notably the production of foodstuffs, leather, and textiles. Recently a regional agricultural market that trades locally produced groceries has been built in the city. Given the potential of southern Albania to supply organically grown products, and its relationship with Greek counterparts of the nearby city of Ioannina, it is likely that the market will dedicate itself to organic farming in the future. However, trademarking and marketing of such products are currently far from European standards. The Chamber of Commerce of the city, created in 1988, promotes trade with the Greek border areas. As part of the financial support from Greece to Albania, the Hellenic Armed Forces built a hospital in the city.

In recent years, many traditional houses are being reconstructed and owners lured to come back, thus revitalizing tourism as a potential revenue source for the local economy. However, some houses continue to degrade from lack of investment, abandonment or inappropriate renovations as local craftsmen are not part of these projects.
In 2010, following the Greek economic crisis, the city was one of the first areas in Albania to suffer, since many Albanian emigrants in Greece are becoming unemployed and thus are returning home.

Infrastructure 

Gjirokastër is served by the SH4 Highway, which connects it to Tepelenë in the north and the Dropull region and Greek border  to the south.

Education 

The first school in the city, a Greek language school, was erected in the city in 1663. It was sponsored by local merchants and functioned under the supervision of the local bishop. In 1821, when the Greek War of Independence broke out, it was destroyed, but it was reopened in 1830. In 1727 a madrasa started to function in the city, and it worked uninterruptedly for 240 years until 1967, when it was closed due to the Cultural Revolution applied in communist Albania. In 1861–1862 a Greek language school for girls was founded, financially supported by the local Greek benefactor Christakis Zografos. The first Albanian school in Gjirokastër was opened in 1886. Today Gjirokastër has seven grammar schools, two general high schools (of which one is the Gjirokastër Gymnasium), and two professional ones. In addition two Greek language high schools are operating in the city.

The city is home to the Eqrem Çabej University, which opened its doors in 1968. The university has recently been experiencing low enrollments, and as a result the departments of Physics, Mathematics, Biochemistry, and Kindergarten Education did not function during the 2008–2009 academic year. In 2006, the establishment of a second university in Gjirokastër, a Greek-language one, was agreed upon after discussions between the Albanian and Greek governments. The program had an attendance of 35 students , but was abruptly suspended when the University of Ioannina in Greece refused to provide teachers for the 2010 school year and the Greek government and the Latsis foundation withdrew funding.

Demography 

Gjirokastër by the population is the largest municipality in the Gjirokastër County. According to INSTAT, based on the 2011 Census, Gjirokastër Municipality was estimated to have 28,673 residents (a density of 53.91 persons/km2) living in 6,919 housing units, while the county as a whole has a total of 72,176 inhabitants. The population of the municipality includes the urban and rural population in its Administrative Units such as: Antigonë; Cepo; Lazarat; Lunxhëri; Odrie and Picar. The city of Gjirokastër itself has a resident population of 19,836 inhabitants which are a predominantly urban population.
In the municipality, the population was spread out, with 16.76% from the age 0 to 14, 69.24% from 15 to 64, and 13.98% who were 65 years of age or older. As far as the city itself is concerned, the population was spread out, with 16.93% from the age 0 to 14, 70.27% from 15 to 64, and 12.78% who were 65 years of age or older.

The town has 43,000 inhabitants. Gjirokastër is home to an ethnic Greek community that according to Human Rights Watch numbered about 4,000 out of 30,000 in 1989, although Greek spokesmen have claimed that up to 34% of the town is Greek. Gjirokastër is considered the center of the Greek community in Albania. Given the large Greek population in the town and surrounding area, there is a Greek consulate in the town. Other minorities are smaller numbers of Aromanians and Roma.

Religion 

The region was part of the Eastern Orthodox diocese of Dryinoupolis, part of the metropolitan bishopric of Ioannina. It was first mentioned in a notitia of the 10th–11th century. With the destruction of nearby Adrianupolis its see was transferred to Gjirokastër and assumed the name Doecese of Dryinopoulis and Argyrokastron. In 1835 it was promoted to metropolitan bishopric under the direct jurisdiction of the Ecumenical Patriarchate of Constantinople. Today, the city is home to a diocese part of the Orthodox Autocephalous Church of Albania. The two existing churches of the city were re-built at the end of the 18th century, after approval by the local Ottoman authorities who received large bribes by the Orthodox community. The Orthodox Cathedral of the "Transfiguration of the Saviour" was rebuilt at 1773 on the site of an older church and is located at the castle quarters.

During the Ottoman period Gjirokastër was a significant centre for the Muslim Sufi Bektashi Order, especially in relation to its spread and literary activity. In the early 19th century during the rule of Ali Pasha, British diplomat William Martin Leake during his journey from Vlorë to Gjirokastra and later to present-day Greece, in his diary describes his arrival on December 26, 1804, in the region of Derópoli, or Dropull as it was known from the local Albanians. According to him, its chief city Gjirokastër numbered about 2000 Muslim families and about 100 Christian families. While Libohovë, also then part of the same region, numbered half of that number with about 1000 Muslim families and 100 Christian families.
In 1925, Albania became the world center of the Bektashi Order, a Muslim sect. The sect was headquartered in Tirana, and Gjirokastër was one of six districts of the Bektashi Order in Albania, with its center at the tekke of Baba Rexheb. The city retains a large Bektashi and Sunni population. Historically there were 15 and tekkes and mosques, of which 13 were functional in 1945. Only Gjirokastër Mosque has survived; the remaining 12 were destroyed or closed during the Cultural Revolution of the communist government in 1967.

According to the 2011 census, which has been widely disputed due to irregularities in the procedure and its data affected by boycott, the percentages of the local population per religious group are: Islam 42,3%, Bektashis 5,3%, Eastern Orthodox 14,6%, Roman Catholics 2,8%, while a 35,2 had not declared any religion or is non-religious. According to the Gjirokastër county census data (which includes other municipalities besides Gjirokastër), it had the highest percentage of atheists compared to all other counties in Albania, with Vlora being the second (6.3% compared to 6.01%).

Culture 

17th-century Ottoman traveller Evliya Çelebi, who visited the city in 1670, described the city in detail. One Sunday, Çelebi heard the sound of a vajtim, the traditional Albanian lament for the dead, performed by a professional mourner. The traveller found the city so noisy that he dubbed Gjirokastër the "city of wailing".

The novel Chronicle in Stone by Albanian writer Ismail Kadare tells the history of this city during the Italian and Greek occupation in World War I and II. It expounds on the customs of the people of Gjirokastër.

At the age of twenty-four, Albanian writer Musine Kokalari wrote an 80-page collection of ten youthful prose tales in her native Gjirokastrian dialect: As my old mother tells me, Tirana, 1941. The book tells the day-by-day struggles of women of Gjirokastër, and describes the prevailing mores of the region.

Gjirokastër, home to both Albanian and Greek polyphonic singing, is also home to the National Folklore Festival that is held every five years. The festival started in 1968 and was most recently held in 2009, its ninth season. The festival takes place on the premises of Gjirokastër Fortress. Gjirokastër is also where the Greek language newspaper Laiko Vima is published. Founded in 1945, it was the only Greek-language printed media allowed during the People's Socialist Republic of Albania.

Landmarks 

The city is built on the slope surrounding the citadel, located on a dominating plateau. Although the city's walls were built in the third century and the city itself was first mentioned in the 12th century, the majority of the existing buildings date from 17th and 18th centuries. Typical houses consist of a tall stone block structure which can be up to five stories high. There are external and internal staircases that surround the house. It is thought that such design stems from fortified country houses typical in southern Albania. The lower storey of the building contains a cistern and the stable. The upper storey is composed of a guest room and a family room containing a fireplace. Further upper stories are to accommodate extended families and are connected by internal stairs. Since Gjirokastër's membership to UNESCO, a number of houses have been restored, though others continue to degrade.

Many houses in Gjirokastër have a distinctive local style that has earned the city the nickname "City of Stone", because most of the old houses have roofs covered with flat dressed stones. A very similar style can be seen in the Pelion district of Greece.  The city, along with Berat, was among the few Albanian cities preserved in the 1960s and 1970s from modernizing building programs. Both cities gained the status of "museum town" and are UNESCO World Heritage sites.

Gjirokastër Fortress dominates the town and overlooks the strategically important route along the river valley. It is open to visitors and contains a military museum featuring captured artillery and memorabilia of the Communist resistance against German occupation, as well as a captured United States Air Force plane forced down by Anastas Ngjela, to commemorate the Communist regime's struggle against the imperialist powers. Additions were built during the 19th and 20th centuries by Ali Pasha of Ioannina and the government of King Zog I of Albania. Today it possesses five towers and houses a clock tower, a church, water fountains, horse stables, and many more amenities. The northern part of the castle was turned into a prison by Zog's government and housed political prisoners during the communist regime.

Gjirokastër features an old Ottoman bazaar which was originally built in the 17th century; it was rebuilt in the 19th century after a fire. There are more than 500 homes preserved as "cultural monuments" in Gjirokastër today. The Gjirokastër Mosque, built in 1757, dominates the bazaar.

When the town was first proposed for inclusion on the World Heritage list in 1988, International Council on Monuments and Sites experts were nonplussed by a number of modern constructions which detracted from the old town's appearance. The historic core of Gjirokastër was finally inscribed in 2005, 15 years after its original nomination.

Sports 
Football (soccer) is popular in Gjirokastër: the city hosts Luftëtari Gjirokastër, a club founded in 1929. The club has competed in international tournaments and currently plays in the Albanian Superliga until 2006–2007 and again from 2016. The soccer matches are played in Gjirokastër Stadium, which can hold up to 8,400 spectators.

International relations 

Gjirokastër is twinned with:
  Grottammare, Italy
  Klina, Kosovo
  Lipjan, Kosovo
  Nardò, Italy

Notable residents 

 Ali Alizoti, 19th century politician
 Fejzi Alizoti, interim Prime Minister of Albania in 1914
 Kyriakoulis Argyrokastritis (−1828), revolutionary of the Greek War of Independence
 Arjan Bellaj, retired soccer player and member of the Albania national football team
 Elmaz Boçe, signatory of the Albanian Declaration of Independence and politician
 Bledar Devolli (born 1978), footballer
 Georgios Dimitriou, 18th century author
 Ioannis Doukas, 19th century painter
 Vangjel Dule, representative of the Greek minority in Albanian politics
 Rauf Fico (1881–1944), politician
 Bashkim Fino, former Prime Minister of Albania
 Christos Gikas, Greco-Roman wrestler
 Ramize Gjebrea, World War II partisan
 Gregory IV of Athens, scholar and Archbishop of Athens
 Altin Haxhi, international soccer player; capped in the Albania national team
 Veli Harxhi, signatory of the Albanian Declaration of Independence and politician
 Fatmir Haxhiu, painter
 Enver Hoxha (1908–1985), former first Secretary of the Albanian Party of Labor, and leader of socialist Albania
 Feim Ibrahimi, composer
 Ismail Kadare (born 1936), novelist and poet, winner of the 2005 Man Booker International Prize, 2009 Prince of Asturias Award, and 2015 Jerusalem Prize
 Mehmed Kalakula, politician
 Xhanfize Keko movie director
 Saim Kokona (born 1934), cinematographer
 Albi Kondi (born 1989), football player
 Eqrem Libohova, former Prime Minister of Albania
 Sabit Lulo, politician
 Bule Naipi, World War II People's Heroine of Albania
 Omer Nishani, Head of State of Albania from 1944 to 1953
 Arlind Nora (born 1980), footballer
 Bahri Omari (1889–1945), politician
 Jani Papadhopulli, signatory of the Albanian Declaration of Independence and politician
 Manthos Papagiannis, 16th century revolutionary
 Xhevdet Picari, commander in the Vlora War
 Pertef Pogoni, politician
 Baba Rexheb, Bektashi Sufi religious leader and saint and 7th Dedebaba of the Bektashi Order
 Xhafer Sadik, 4th Dedebaba of the Bektashi Order
 Mehmet Tahsini, politician and professor
 Bajo Topulli, brother of Çerçiz, nationalist and guerrilla fighter
 Çerçiz Topulli, 20th-century nationalist and guerrilla fighter
 Takis Tsiakos (1909–1997), Greek poet
 Alexandros Vasileiou, merchant and Greek scholar
 Michael Vasileiou, merchant; brother of Alexandros
 Mahmud Xhelaledini, politician
 Arjan Xhumba, retired soccer player and member of the Albania national football team

Gallery

See also 
 History of Albania
 Greeks in Albania

References

Sources 
 "Gjirokastër". Encyclopædia Britannica, 2006
 "Gjirokastër or Gjinokastër". The Columbia Encyclopedia, 2004

External links 

bashkiagjirokaster.gov.al – Official Website 
visit-gjirokastra.com – Official Tourism Website
gjirokastra.or – Conservation and Development Organization

Gjirokastër
Administrative units of Gjirokastër
Cities in Albania
Greek communities in Albania
Labëria
Municipalities in Gjirokastër County
Aromanian settlements in Albania
Ottoman architecture in Albania
World Heritage Sites in Albania